Furnace Creek may refer to:

Populated places
Furnace Creek, California in Inyo County

Streams

California
Furnace Creek in Mono County
Furnace Creek Wash Inyo County

Georgia
Furnace Creek in Walker County
Furnace Creek in Madison County

Idaho
Furnace Creek in Lemhi County

Illinois
Furnace Creek in Jo Daviess County

Kentucky
West Fork Laura Furnace Creek in Trigg County
Laura Furnace Creek in Trigg County
Mammoth Furnace Creek in Lyon County

Maryland
Furnace Branch in Frederick County
Furnace Creek (or Furnace Branch) meeting Marley Creek to form Curtis Creek in northern Anne Arundel County and southern Baltimore City 

Missouri
Furnace Creek in Grundy County
Furnace Creek (Big River)

New York
Furnace Creek in Oneida County

Ohio
Jackson Furnace Creek in Jackson County
Harrison Furnace Creek in Scioto County
Bloom Furnace Creek in Scioto County

Pennsylvania
Furnace Creek in Berks County
Furnace Creek in York County

South Carolina
Furnace Creek in Cherokee County

Tennessee
South Fork Furnace Creek in Johnson County
Furnace Creek in Johnson County
Furnace Creek in Johnson County
East Fork Furnace Creek in Johnson County
Furnace Creek in Dickson County

Virginia
East Prong Furnace Creek in Floyd County
Furnace Creek in Floyd County
Furnace Creek in Franklin County
West Prong Furnace Creek in Floyd County, Virginia

Wisconsin
Furnace Creek in Lafayette County
Furnace Creek in Sauk County

See also
Furnace Run (disambiguation)